Moharramabad (also Romanized as Moḩarramābād) is a village in Shabeh Rural District, Jangal District, Roshtkhar County, Razavi Khorasan Province, Iran. At the 2006 census, its population was 146, in 44 families.

References 

Populated places in Roshtkhar County